Charlotte O'Hara (January 7, 1951) was a Republican member of the Kansas House of Representatives, representing District 27 from 2011 to 2013. She previously served as a member of the Kansas City and the Olathe Home Builders Associations and served as chairwoman on the Olathe Board of Code Review.

O'Hara is an investor from Overland Park, and was previously a general contractor and real-estate developer in the Kansas City metropolitan area and Johnson County, Kansas. Raised in Mapleton, Kansas, she is married to Spencer O'Hara.  She has a degree from the University of Kansas.

Committee assignments

2011-2012
In the 2011-2012 legislative session, O'Hara served on these House committees:
 Agriculture and Natural Resources Committee
 Federal and State Affairs Committee
 Financial Institutions Committee
 Insurance Committee

Elections

2010
O'Hara put herself forward as a candidate for the Republican nomination in Kansas' 3rd U.S. House district in early 2010, but dropped out of the race before the primary election. O'Hara was elected by Republican precinct delegates to fill a vacancy in the State House of Representatives early in 2011. The vacancy occurred after Kansas Sen. Jeff Colyer was elected lieutenant governor in the 2010 general election. House District 27 Rep. Ray Merrick was elected by Republican precinct committee members to fill the remainder of Colyer's Senate District 37 term; then O'Hara was elected to fill Merrick's House seat.

2012
After redistricting for the 2012 elections, O'Hara filed for the Kansas Senate District 37 seat being vacated by Ray Merrick. O'Hara placed second in a three-way Republican primary. Republican District 37 nominee Pat Apple, the District 12 incumbent, was unopposed in the November 6, 2012 general election. Merrick won the House District 27 seat, and was elected speaker of the House on Dec. 2, 2012.

Sources
O'Hara's official biography
Kansas House profile

Notes

External links
Kansas House profile
Charlotte O'Hara's website

Living people
Republican Party members of the Kansas House of Representatives
People from Bourbon County, Kansas
Politicians from Overland Park, Kansas
University of Kansas alumni
Women state legislators in Kansas
1951 births
21st-century American women politicians
21st-century American politicians